The CAP 450 is a French trailerable sailboat for day sailing and fishing, first built in 1986.

Production
The design was built by Jeanneau in France, starting in 1986, but it is now out of production.

Design
The CAP 450 is a recreational keelboat, built predominantly of fiberglass, with wood trim. It has a fractional sloop rig. The hull has a raked stem, an angled transom, a transom-hung rudder controlled by a tiller and a fixed long keel. It displaces .

See also
List of sailing boat types

References

External links

Photo of a CAP 450

Keelboats
1980s sailboat type designs
Sailing yachts
Trailer sailers
Sailboat types built by Jeanneau